Get Happy with the Randy Weston Trio is a jazz album by American jazz pianist Randy Weston recorded in 1955 and released on the Riverside label.

Reception

The Allmusic review by Jim Todd stated: "This early release from Randy Weston finds the pianist still in his formative stages... The set shows Weston's facility with standards, Ellingtonia, even ragtime, but, with several tracks coming in well under four minutes, the performances offer little room for development. The impression here is that of a pianist of great potential limbering up before the curtain rises for the show".

Track listing 
All compositions by Randy Weston, except as indicated
 "Get Happy" (Harold Arlen, Ted Koehler) - 3:42    
 "Fire Down There" (Traditional) - later renamed "St. Thomas" - 2:51    
 "Where Are You?" (Harold Adamson, Jimmy McHugh) - 4:09    
 "Under Blunder" - 3:06    
 "Dark Eyes" (Florian Hermann) - 3:34    
 "Summertime" (George Gershwin, Ira Gershwin, DuBose Heyward) - 3:56    
 "Bass Knows" - 5:15    
 "C Jam Blues" (Barney Bigard, Duke Ellington) - 2:49    
 "A Ballad" (Sam Gill) - 4:20    
 "Twelfth Street Rag" (Euday L. Bowman) - 2:59

Personnel 
Randy Weston - piano 
Sam Gill - bass 
Wilbert Hogan - drums

References 

Randy Weston albums
1956 albums
Riverside Records albums
Albums recorded at Van Gelder Studio
Albums produced by Orrin Keepnews